Borealaspis is an extinct genus of Trilobite. It contains two species, B. biformis, and B. whittakerensis.

External links
 Borealaspis at the Paleobiology Database

Ordovician trilobites of North America
Paleozoic life of the Northwest Territories
Paleozoic life of Quebec
Cheiruridae
Phacopida genera